Vic Garth (9 September 1912 – 10 April 2005) was town crier in Hobart, Tasmania, for more than 20 years, until his death in April 2005 at the age of 92. Though battling cancer for several years, he continued to greet cruise ships as they arrived, and frequently appeared at Hobart's Salamanca Market on Saturdays. In 2003 he became known as the oldest town crier in the world.

References

External links
 T Wayne Fox, "Oldest town crier honored", Church News, 25 September 2004
 "World's oldest town crier has no plans to retire" - AAP
 "Hobart Council pays tribute to town crier" - ABC Online
 John L. Hart, "Town's crier a good member-missionary", Church News, 5 July 2003
 "And also for mention..." - QUEST

History of Hobart
2005 deaths
Town criers
1912 births
People from Hobart